79 may refer to: 
 79 (number)
 one of the years 79 BC, AD 79, 1979, 2079
 79 A.D., a 1962 historical epic film
 Eruption of Mount Vesuvius in 79, a catastrophic volcanic eruption in Italy

See also
 
 List of highways numbered